Sailing at the 2004 Summer Paralympics took place at the Agios Kosmas Olympic Sailing Centre from September 18-September 23. The sailors were a mix of physically and visually impaired men and women competing together.

The classes sailed were:
 2.4mR single-handed keelboat
 Sonar three person keelboat

Medal table

Medal summary

Results

One Person Keelboat - 2.4 Metre

Open Three-Person Keelboat - Sonar

Reference and Links

Event Website
Original World Sailing Microsite

2004 Summer Paralympics events
2004
Paralympics
Sailing competitions in Greece